Fucoidan is a long chain sulfated polysaccharide found in various species of brown algae. Commercially available fucoidan is commonly extracted from the seaweed species Fucus vesiculosus, Cladosiphon okamuranus, Laminaria japonica and Undaria pinnatifida. Variant forms of fucoidan have also been found in animal species, including the sea cucumber.

Fucoidan occurs in the cell walls of the seaweed plant and serves to protect it from external stresses. The same protective benefits that are of value to the seaweed plant have also found to be of potential benefit for both human and animal health. Fucoidan extracts are utilised in a range of therapeutic health care preparations, being incorporated as high value ingredients in nutritional, medical device, skincare and dermatological products.

The bioactivity of fucoidan extracts is largely determined by the fucoidan extraction method and the seaweed species from which it is extracted. Fucoidan extraction methods, purity, bioactivity, global regulatory approvals and source seaweed species vary between fucoidan producers.

History 
Fucoidan-containing seaweeds have a rich history of medicinal and therapeutic use. The earliest records have been unearthed at Monte Verde in Chile, where archaeological digs have uncovered evidence of their use dating to circa 12000 BC. Early therapeutic use was also evident in ancient Greek and Roman civilizations. In the 17th century, the English botanist John Gerard noted the use of seaweed to treat a wide variety of ailments.

Fucoidan itself was not isolated and described until the early 1900s. In 1913, Swedish Professor Harald Kylin became the first to describe the slimy film found on many seaweeds as ‘fucoidin’ or ‘fucoijin’. The substance subsequently became known as ‘fucoidan’ based on the international naming convention on sugars. 
Research in the early 20th century focused on extracting crude extracts and reconciling some of the conflicting views on fucoidan. Methods of extracts and isolation of fucoidan from brown seaweeds were determined on laboratory scale by Black et al. at the Institute of Seaweed Research in the UK.

Global research opportunities expanded once fucoidan became commercially available in the 1970s from Sigma Inc. Anti-cancer effects were amongst the first to be reported by Japanese researchers, followed by effects on immune modulation and then anti-tumour, anti-viral and anti-inflammatory responses.

Today, fucoidan continues to be used as a complementary therapy in many parts of Asia, namely Japan and Korea, where it is not uncommon for it to be recommended to patients undergoing treatment for cancer. Interest in, and use of, fucoidan is growing rapidly across the western world as scientific research gains momentum and global regulatory approvals expand. The use of fucoidan as a novel ingredient in dietary supplements, skincare products and functional foods and beverages is increasing.

Active research into the health benefits of fucoidan continues across a range of health indications including anti-cancer, immune modulation, anti-viral, digestive health, anti-inflammation, wound healing and anti-ageing applications.

Research 
Over 2300 scientific peer-reviewed papers now indicate various bioactive functions of fucoidan. Research has predominantly focussed on the areas of anti-cancer, anti-viral, anti-inflammation, immunity, gut and digestive health, wound healing and anti-ageing. Emerging areas of scientific research include microbiome, renal disease, dental health, biomaterials, drug delivery, coagulation and neuroprotection.

Active fucoidan research occurs in Australia, Japan, Korea, Russia and China in addition to Europe and the Americas.

Chemistry 
Fucoidans are sulfated polysaccharides derived primarily from brown algae. The main sugar found in the polymer backbone is fucose, hence the name fucoidan. Other sugars are often present alongside fucose, including galactose, xylose, arabinose and rhamnose. The relative content of these sugars in fucoidan varies significantly between species of algae and can also be affected by the extraction method. The same holds true for the degree of sulfation and other structural features such as acetylation that are only found in fucoidans from certain species. The polymer backbone is negatively charged owing to the presence of sulfate groups and is thus balanced by the presence of metal cations.

The molecular weight of fucoidans is typically high (ca. 50-1000 kDa) and the distribution polydisperse. Extraction techniques that minimise polymer degradation tend to preserve this feature, while other methods can be used to target more specific molecular weight fractions (e.g. 8 kDa). These low molecular weight fractions are generally low yielding and tend to be used for functional research.

Full chemical characterisation is complicated by the number of structural features present in fucoidan. As such, accurate fucoidan analysis involves the use of a number of assays, to quantify the carbohydrates, sulfation, acetylation, molecular weight and cations. These are determined using a number of techniques, including UV-Vis spectrometry, High Performance Liquid Chromatography (HPLC), Atomic Absorption Spectrometry (AAS) and Inductively-Coupled Plasma Spectrometry (ICP). Gas Chromatography (GC) is also often used to determine the sugar composition of the carbohydrate backbone.

Fucoidan product 
Fucoidan can be utilised as a stand-alone ingredient or readily incorporated with other ingredients. Delivery formats vary from capsules and tablets to creams, gels, liquids and serums.

Fucoidan is currently utilised in a wide range of products currently on the market such as dietary supplements, skincare products, medical devices, functional food and beverages and animal health products. Fucoidan is also utilised in medical and pharmaceutical research.

Safety 
Clinical testing has confirmed that high purity, certified organic fucoidan extracts are safe for human consumption. Fucoidan is a natural seaweed compound that has been shown to be non-toxic and non-allergenic.

In recent years certain fucoidan extracts have attained regulatory approvals in a number of global jurisdictions for use in food and dietary supplements. Some extracts from Undaria pinnatifida and Fucus vesiculosus seaweeds have been granted ‘Generally Recognised as Safe’ (GRAS) status with the US FDA and have also been approved as novel foods in the European Union.

A 2019 review paper noted that not only do global regulatory approvals continue to expand, but so too does variation in the quality of commercially available extracts. Studies showed that some fucoidan preparations sold commercially for use in food and supplements may not contain fucoidan as stated. Some appear to be alternative polysaccharides, whilst others may be substituted with glucose or cellulose. Manufacturers are encouraged to verify the provenance and identity of their fucoidan ingredients before incorporating them into formulations and to purchase from reputable fucoidan producers.

Sustainability 
Leading fucoidan producers demonstrate a strong commitment to the sustainable and ethical sourcing of seaweed from which to extract fucoidan. They are able to demonstrate quality and transparency across the supply chain, from the seaweed harvesting process through to fucoidan manufacturing methods, energy consumption, quality assurance and waste management.

As the commercial use of seaweed gains momentum across the globe, and novel applications rise to the fore, it is important that sustainable management practices are maintained. Global fucoidan producers currently vary in their seaweed harvesting practices, locations and standards, including harvesting wild stocks vs farmed seaweeds, and harvesting in clean ocean waters vs those prone to various forms of contamination.

See also
Porphyran
Phycocolloid

References

External links
 Refer to 69th Annual Meeting of the Japanese Cancer Association
 Refer to Fucoidan evidence
 Refer to Fucoidan Tsushin
 Specified non-profit juridical person（NPO）
 Cytotechnology（2005）47:117 126
 Refer to NPO Research Institute of Fucoidan

Dietary supplements
Polysaccharides
Brown algae